Sam or Samuel Baker may refer to:

Arts and entertainment
 Samuel Burtis Baker (1882–1967), American artist and teacher
 Samuel Henry Baker (1824–1909), English artist
 Sam Baker (actor) (1907–1982), American actor in Jungle Mystery
 Sam Baker (musician) (born 1954), American folk musician from Texas
 Sam Baker (writer) (born 1966), British writer and former editor-in-chief of Cosmopolitan
 Samiyam (Sam Baker, born 1984), American hip hop producer

Sports
 Sam Baker (halfback) (1930–2007), American football player
 Sam Baker (offensive tackle) (born 1985), American football player
 Sam Baker (Australian footballer) (1874–1946), Australian rules footballer

Others
 Samuel Baker (divine) (died 1660), English clergyman
 Sam Aaron Baker (1874–1933), American politician and governor of Missouri
 Samuel Baker (died 1778), bookseller and founder of Sotheby's
 Sir Samuel Baker (1821–1893), English explorer

See also
Samuel Baker House (disambiguation)